The 2011 Harlequins Rugby League season was the thirty-second in the club's history and their sixteenth season in the Super League. The club was coached by Rob Powell, competing in Super League XVI, finishing in 12th place and reaching the Fifth round of the 2011 Challenge Cup.

It was their fifth consecutive season at the Stoop. They exited the Challenge Cup with a defeat to the Leeds Rhinos.

2011 squad

Super League XVI table

References

External links
Rugby League Project

London Broncos seasons
Harlequins Rugby League season
Harlequins Rugby League season